Douglas Alan Barrowman (born March 1965) is a Scottish businessman. He founded the Knox Group of Companies and has invested in Ve Interactive, Aston Ventures, and Equi Capital. He is married to Michelle Mone.

In 2022, in a series of investigative pieces, The Guardian reported that Barrowman, Mone and their children had secretly received £45.8 million in payments to offshore accounts from government PPE contracts, which they had lobbied for during the COVID-19 pandemic. The police launched an investigation into Barrowman's activities in January 2022.

Early life
Barrowman was born on 1 March 1965 in Glasgow, Scotland. He was raised in Simshill, before moving to Rutherglen at the age of 13, where he attended King's Park Secondary School. He later attended Glasgow University, graduating with a Bachelor of Accountancy degree in 1985.

Career

Early career 
After graduating, Barrowman completed his professional examinations and qualified as a chartered accountant. He worked for 3i, a private equity fund. Barrowman resigned from 3i in 1992, to set up his own corporate finance practice during the 1990s. He exited from the practice in 1999.

Aston Ventures 
In 1999, Barrowman founded Aston Ventures, a private investment vehicle. Over the next ten years, Aston Ventures made 13 acquisitions of "old economy" businesses, including the third largest cable making company in the world B3 Cables, with a total turnover of about £400 million over that period.

The Knox Group 
In 2008, Barrowman moved to the Isle of Man and founded The Knox Group of Companies which owned several businesses, including Aston Ventures. Barrowman was also a director of Aston Management Ltd (AML), which provided tax advice and offshore loan schemes to freelance workers including social workers, locum doctors, nurses and engineers. AML's services came under scrutiny after the UK government announced in 2017 that it would be claiming back tax from 50,000 scheme users through the Loan Charge measure, leading to criticism in the House of Commons. AML ceased trading in 2010 before the tax rules changed. In October 2020, a BBC report highlighted how thousands of AML customers were left facing a retrospective Loan Charge by HMRC. 

In 2011 Barrowman co-founded the KHG Private Equity Fund.

Financial Provisions Solutions  
Knox Group owned Financial Provisions Solutions, which went into voluntary liquidation in January 2019. In December 2022, the Daily Record reported that Army veterans lost tens of thousands of pounds when they transferred out of the final salary Army scheme to Financial Provisions Solutions.

Other business activities 
In 2017, Barrowman became the interim chairman of Ve Interactive, after an emergency cash injection and investment into the firm. In the same year, Aston Plaza and Residences, a residential and commercial property development in Dubai priced in bitcoin, was launched.

PPE Medpro 
The Guardian released a set of articles, first in 2020 but then again in November 2022, detailing Barrowman and Mone's implication in lobbying for government PPE contracts, and the financial rewards they saw from these government contracts. Barrowman received £45.8 million in payments to his private offshore accounts from £200 million government contracts with the money earmarked for PPE during the COVID-19 pandemic in the United Kingdom.

Personal life
Barrowman has four children from his first two marriages. He married Michelle Mone in 2020. 

The Prince's Trust Doug Barrowman Centre in the Ancoats area of Manchester opened in 2019 following a donation by Barrowman of £2 million to the Prince's Trust. 

Barrowman has six homes, a collection of fifteen cars and a private jet. He was featured on a 2015 episode of the television series Million Pound Mega Yacht, featuring his 55-metre yacht named Turquoise.

References

Scottish philanthropists
Businesspeople from Glasgow
Alumni of the University of Glasgow
Scottish accountants
1965 births
Living people
British investors
Spouses of life peers